Geef Nooit Op (Dutch: never give up) is a Dutch television series broadcast by VARA and RTL 4 between November 1991 and february 1997 and presented by Peter Jan Rens. The concept was based on the BBC series Jim'll Fix It. The show encouraged children to write in a letter to Rens with a "wish" that would come true at the end of each episode.

Transmission guide

Compilations

References

1991 Dutch television series debuts
1997 Dutch television series endings
1990s Dutch television series
Dutch children's television series
Dutch-language television shows